Alipura (Alipura Kalan) is a village in Saharanpur District in the Meerut Division of western Uttar Pradesh, India. The most common occupation of this village is agriculture. It is in the western part of Saharanpur, and is surrounded by agricultural lands.

Education
 Jai Seva Vidhlaya, Private School
 Junior Primary School, Government of UP 
 Senior Primary School, Government of UP
 Mr.Sir Sayyad Academy Madarsa, Private School

Nearby cities
Saharanpur City - 8 km
Nakur- 17 km
Rampur Maniharan- 21 km
Haibat (Yamuna Nagar)- 24 km

Nearby districts

Nearby taluks

Population (2011)

Notable Person 
 Alam Tanveer
 Alam Khan
 Dr Bikram Sing
 Dr Mangha
 Haji Rana
 Mangal Singh
 Wasif Ahmed

See also 
Sarsawan

References

External links
 Official Website
 Mysaharanpur.com: a comprehensive web portal and forum for and about Saharanpur
 Order to form a commissionary.

Villages in Saharanpur district